Larry Schneider may refer to:

Larry Schneider (politician), Canadian politician
Larry Schneider (musician), American jazz saxophonist